Franco Marcelo Pérez Portillo (born 1 August 2001) is a Uruguayan footballer who plays as a forward for Uruguayan Primera División club Rentistas.

Career
Pérez is a youth academy graduate of Rentistas. He made his professional debut for the club on 7 March 2020, coming on as a 71st minute substitute for Gonzalo Vega in a 4–1 league victory over Deportivo Maldonado. He made an instant impact in the match by scoring his team's second goal six minutes later.

Pérez is a current Uruguayan youth international.

Career statistics

Club

References

External links

2001 births
Living people
C.A. Rentistas players
Uruguayan Primera División players
Uruguayan footballers
Association football forwards